Juan de Grijalva (born c. 1490 in Cuéllar, Crown of Castile – 21 January 1527 in Honduras) was a Spanish conquistador, and a relative of Diego Velázquez. He went to Hispaniola in 1508 and to Cuba in 1511. He was one of the early explorers of the Mexican coastline.

1518 expedition

In 1518, Grijalva became one of the first to explore the shores of Mexico.  According to Hernán Cortés, 170 people went with him, but according to Pedro Mártir, there were 300 people.  The main pilot was Antón de Alaminos, the other pilots were Juan Álvarez (also known as el Manquillo), Pedro Camacho de Triana, and Grijalva. Other members included Francisco de Montejo, Pedro de Alvarado, Juan Díaz, Francisco Peñalosa, Alonso de Ávila, Alonso Hernández, Julianillo, Melchorejo, and Antonio Villafaña. They embarked from the port of Matanzas, Cuba, with four ships in April 1518.

After rounding the Guaniguanico in Cuba, Grijalva sailed along the Mexican coast, discovered Cozumel, and arrived on 1 May at the Tabasco region in southern Mexico. The Río Grijalva in Mexico was named after him. He was also the first Spaniard to encounter Moctezuma II's delegation. One of the natives joined them, being baptized as Francisco, and became an interpreter on Cortes' expedition. Bernal Díaz del Castillo wrote about the travels of Juan de Grijalva in his book Historia de las Indias..

In 1518 Hernán Cortés stayed at Juan's home in Trinidad, Cuba, at the start of his Mexican expedition. He recruited men there, including the five Alvarado brothers.

He was killed by natives in Honduras on 21 January 1527.

References

Spanish conquistadors
History of the Aztecs
Spanish explorers of North America
16th-century Spanish people
People of New Spain
Colonial Mexico
Spanish colonial period of Cuba
History of Hispaniola
Spanish West Indies
1490s births
1527 deaths
Explorers of Mexico